The 2011 e-Boks Sony Ericsson Open was the second edition of the tennis tournament e-Boks Danish Open, an international-level tournament on the 2011 WTA Tour. It was the second edition of the tournament. It took place on indoor hard courts in Farum, Denmark between 6 and 12 June 2011.

WTA entrants

Seeds

 1 Rankings are as of May 23, 2011.

Other entrants
The following players received wildcards into the singles main draw:
  Julia Boserup
  Malou Ejdesgaard
  Karolína Plíšková

The following players received entry from the qualifying draw:

  Mona Barthel 
  Alexa Glatch
  Johanna Konta
  Galina Voskoboeva

Fibals

Singles

 Caroline Wozniacki defeated  Lucie Šafářová, 6–1, 6–4
 It was Wozniacki's 5th title of the year and 17th of her career. She defended her title.

Doubles

 Johanna Larsson /  Jasmin Wöhr defeated  Kristina Mladenovic /  Katarzyna Piter, 6–3, 6–3

References

External links 
 

e-Boks Sony Ericsson Open
2011 E-Boks Danish Open
2011 in Danish tennis